In quantum mechanics, an antisymmetrizer  (also known as antisymmetrizing operator) is a linear operator that makes a wave function of N identical fermions antisymmetric under the exchange of the coordinates of any pair of fermions. After application of  the wave function satisfies the Pauli exclusion principle. Since  is a projection operator, application of the antisymmetrizer to a wave function that is already totally antisymmetric has no effect, acting as the identity operator.

Mathematical definition 
Consider a wave function depending on the space and spin coordinates of N fermions:

For electrons s = 1/2 and σ can have two values ("spin-up": 1/2  and "spin-down": −1/2). It is assumed that the positions of the coordinates in the notation for  Ψ have a well-defined meaning. For instance,  the 2-fermion function Ψ(1,2) will in general be not the same as  Ψ(2,1). This implies that in general  and therefore we can define meaningfully a transposition operator  that interchanges the coordinates of particle i and j. In general this operator will not be equal to the identity operator (although in special cases it may be). 

A transposition has the
parity (also known as signature) −1. The Pauli principle postulates  that a wave function of identical fermions  must be an eigenfunction of a transposition operator with its parity as eigenvalue

Here we associated the transposition operator  with the permutation of coordinates π that acts on the set of N coordinates. In this case π = (ij), where (ij) is the cycle notation for the transposition of the coordinates of particle i and j.

Transpositions  may be composed (applied in sequence). This defines a product between the transpositions that is associative. 
It can be shown that an arbitrary permutation of N objects can be written as a product of transpositions and that the  number of transposition in this decomposition is of fixed parity. That is, either a permutation is always decomposed in an even number of transpositions (the permutation is called even and has the parity +1), or a permutation is always decomposed in an odd number of transpositions and then it is an odd permutation with parity −1. Denoting the parity of an arbitrary permutation π by (−1)π, it follows that an antisymmetric wave function satisfies

where we associated the  linear operator  with the permutation π.

The set of all N! permutations with the associative product: "apply one permutation after the other", is a group, known as the permutation group or symmetric group, denoted by SN.  We define the antisymmetrizer as

Properties of the antisymmetrizer 
In the representation theory of finite groups the antisymmetrizer is a well-known object, because the set of parities  forms a one-dimensional (and hence irreducible) representation of the permutation group known as the antisymmetric representation. The representation being one-dimensional, the set of parities  form the character of the antisymmetric representation. The antisymmetrizer is in fact a character projection operator and is quasi-idempotent,

This has the consequence that for any N-particle wave function Ψ(1, ...,N) we have

Either Ψ does not have an antisymmetric component, and then the antisymmetrizer projects onto zero, or it has one and then the antisymmetrizer projects out this antisymmetric component Ψ'.
The antisymmetrizer carries a left and a right representation of the group:

with the operator  representing the coordinate permutation π.
Now it holds, for any N-particle wave function Ψ(1, ...,N) with a non-vanishing antisymmetric component, that

showing that the non-vanishing component is indeed antisymmetric.

If a wave function is symmetric under any odd parity permutation it has no antisymmetric component. Indeed, assume that the permutation π, represented by the operator ,  has odd parity and that Ψ is symmetric, then

As an example of an application of this result, we assume that Ψ is a spin-orbital product. Assume further that a spin-orbital occurs twice (is "doubly occupied") in this product, once with coordinate k and once with coordinate q. Then the product is symmetric under the transposition (k, q) and hence vanishes. Notice that this result gives the original formulation of the Pauli principle: no two electrons can have the same set of quantum numbers (be in the same spin-orbital).

Permutations of identical particles are unitary, (the Hermitian adjoint is equal to the inverse of the operator), and since π and π−1 have the same parity, it follows that the antisymmetrizer is Hermitian,

The antisymmetrizer commutes with any observable  (Hermitian operator corresponding to a physical—observable—quantity)

If it were otherwise, measurement  of  could distinguish the particles, in contradiction with the assumption that only the coordinates of indistinguishable particles are affected by the antisymmetrizer.

Connection with Slater determinant
In the special case that the wave function to be antisymmetrized is a product of spin-orbitals

the Slater determinant is created by the antisymmetrizer operating on the product of spin-orbitals, as below:

The correspondence follows immediately from the Leibniz formula for determinants, which reads

where B is the matrix

To see the correspondence we notice that the fermion labels, permuted by the terms in the antisymmetrizer,  label different columns (are second indices). The first indices are orbital indices, n1, ..., nN labeling the rows.

Example
By the definition of the antisymmetrizer

Consider the Slater determinant

By the Laplace expansion along the first row of D

so that 

By comparing terms we see that

Intermolecular antisymmetrizer 
One often meets a wave function of the product form
 where the total wave function is not antisymmetric, but the factors are antisymmetric,

and

Here  antisymmetrizes the first NA particles and  antisymmetrizes the second set of NB particles. The operators appearing in these two antisymmetrizers represent the elements of the subgroups SNA and SNB, respectively, of SNA+NB. 

The total system can be antisymmetrized by the total antisymmetrizer  which consists of the (NA + NB)! terms in the group  SNA+NB. However, in this way one does not take advantage of the partial antisymmetry that is already present. It is more economic to use the fact that the product of the two subgroups is also a subgroup, and to consider the left cosets of this product group in  SNA+NB:

where τ is a left coset representative.  Since 

we can write

The operator  represents the coset representative τ (an intermolecular coordinate permutation). Obviously the intermolecular antisymmetrizer  has  a factor NA! NB! fewer terms then the total antisymmetrizer.
Finally,

so that we see that it suffices to act with  if the wave functions of the subsystems are already antisymmetric.

See also 
 Slater determinant
 Identical particles

References

Pauli exclusion principle
Permutations
Quantum chemistry
Quantum mechanics
Determinants